Laura Gail Siering (born February 23, 1957) is an American former competition swimmer who represented the United States at the 1976 Summer Olympics in Montreal, Quebec.  She won a silver medal as a member of the second-place U.S. team in the women's 4×100-meter medley relay, together with Linda Jezek (backstroke), Camille Wright (butterfly), and Shirley Babashoff (freestyle).  Siering also competed in the women's 100-meter breaststroke and 200-meter breaststroke at the 1976 Olympics, but did not advance to the finals in either event.

See also
 List of Olympic medalists in swimming (women)
 List of University of Southern California people

References

External links
 

1957 births
Living people
American female breaststroke swimmers
Olympic silver medalists for the United States in swimming
Sportspeople from Pomona, California
Swimmers at the 1975 Pan American Games
Swimmers at the 1976 Summer Olympics
USC Trojans women's swimmers
Medalists at the 1976 Summer Olympics
Pan American Games gold medalists for the United States
Pan American Games medalists in swimming
Medalists at the 1975 Pan American Games